2dcloud is a publisher of comic books, graphic novels and artist books based in Chicago. It was founded by Maggie Umber and Raighne Hogan in 2007.

Publications

References

External links 
 Official website

Book publishing companies based in Illinois
Comic book publishing companies of the United States
Comics anthologies
Publishing companies established in 2007

Marinaomi